Tim Nackashi is an American filmmaker, documentarian, and music video director.  He is perhaps best known for his one-take music video for OK Go's WTF? and the documentary film Dirty Work co-directed by David Sampliner and executive produced by Edward Norton, which had its premier at the Sundance Film Festival.

Career
Nackashi has created music videos for Maroon 5, Neon Indian and Death Cab for Cutie.  He created a 360-degree video interactive film for the song "Are We" by musician Craig Wedren.  In addition to music videos and commercial work, he continues to create socially aware documentaries such as the short film "Through the Wall" and the PSA "Is History Repeating Itself?" which was co-directed with Aya Tanimura and executive produced by Katy Perry.

Films and Documentaries
"Is History Repeating Itself?" PSA (2016)  
"Through the Wall" short documentary (2015) 
"Dirty Work"

Music videos

No Lie, Sean Paul and Dua Lipa the music video also surpassed 1 billion views on YouTube in April 2022, making it Sean Paul most popular music video. 
Caffeinated Consciousness, T.V. On The Radio
Polish Girl, Slum Lord Rising, Neon Indian
Girl Friend, Icona Pop
Flying Overseas, Tribe, Theophilus London
Lying to You, Goldroom
Never Gonna Leave This Bed, Maroon 5
You Are a Tourist, Death Cab for Cutie, the first live one-take music video
Shower, Becky G

Commercials
Heineken
Ray-Ban
HP

Soundtracks
The Paper
"Dirty Work" (2014)

Discography
Albums as Empire State
 Empire State (Warm Electronic Recordings, 2000)
 Eternal Combustion (Warm Electronic Recordings, 2001)

Awards
Imagen Awards  "Though The Wall"  (2016) 
Webby Award  WTF? OK Go (2009)
Grammy Award (nomination) Best Long Format Music Video "Caffeinated Consciousness" T.V. On The Radio
MTV Video Music Award (nomination) Best Art Direction You Are a Tourist Death Cab for Cutie
Atlanta Film Festival Best Documentary "Dirty Work"(2004)
BendFilm Festival Jury Prize "Dirty Work" (2004)

External links
 
 Official artist website

References

Living people
American film producers
American film directors
American music video directors
Year of birth missing (living people)
Warm Electronic Recordings artists